Under en steinhimmel (Under a Stone Sky) is a Norwegian war film directed by Knut Andersen, Igor Maslennikov, and Stanislav Rostotsky. The film is a fictionalized portrayal of historical events.

Plot
The film tells the story of people that moved into the mine shafts at Bjørnevatn in eastern Finnmark county, Norway during the Second World War. They sought to escape the evacuation and burning of Finnmark. During the winter of 1944, the mines had a population between 2,000 and 3,000. They faced the danger of the German forces hearing about this and taking action before the Russians managed to liberate the area.

References

External links 
 
 Norsk filmografi: Under en steinhimmel

1974 films
Norwegian historical films
Norwegian World War II films
Films directed by Knut Andersen
1970s Norwegian-language films
Films set in Norway
Soviet multilingual films
1970s Russian-language films
Norwegian multilingual films
1974 multilingual films